Apseudopsis latreillii is a species of tanaidacean widely-distributed in the north-east Atlantic and Mediterranean coastal waters.

References

Tanaidacea